Alisa Kireeva (born August 17, 1989 in Kiev, Ukraine) is a Ukrainian former competitive figure skater. She is the 2006 Ukrainian national silver medalist. She placed 19th in the qualifying round at the 2006 World Figure Skating Championships. Kireeva is coached by Viacheslav Zagorodniuk.

Competitive history

 J = Junior level; QR = Qualifying Round; WD = Withdrew

External links
 

Ukrainian female single skaters
Figure skaters at the 2007 Winter Universiade
1989 births
Living people
Sportspeople from Kyiv